Manly Daniel Davis (1879–1950) was a housing developer in Detroit as well as in its northern suburbs in Oakland County.

Davis was born in Pontiac, Michigan.  He developed the Palmer Park and Sherwood Forest neighborhoods in what was then Greenfield Township, Michigan but would be later annexed into Detroit.  He later was involved in subdivision development in Bloomfield Township, Oakland County, Michigan.

Further reading

Sources
Hagman, Arhur A. Oakland County Book of History. 1970. p. 46.

1879 births
1950 deaths
American real estate businesspeople
People from Pontiac, Michigan